A millionaire is a person whose net worth is at least one million in a relatively high-value unit of currency. 

Millionaire or Millionairess may also refer to:

Music 
Millionaire (band), a Belgian band
Millionaires (duo), an all-female electronic music duo from Los Angeles, 2000s

Albums
Millionaires (album), a 1999 album by James
Millionaire (Kevin Welch album), 2002
Millionaire, an EP by The Mekons

Songs
"Millionaire" (Chris Stapleton song), 2017
"Millionaire" (Cash Cash  and Digital Farm Animals song), 2016 
"Millionaire" (Beady Eye song), 2011
"Millionaire" (Kelis song), 2003
"Millionaire", a song by the Cherry Poppin' Daddies' from Kids on the Street
"Millionaire", a song by the Mekons from I Love Mekons, 1993
"Millionaire", a song by Plastilina Mosh
"You Think I Ain't Worth a Dollar, But I Feel Like a Millionaire", a song by Queens of the Stone Age from Songs for the Deaf, sometimes abbreviated to "Millionaire"

Sports teams 
Vancouver Millionaires, a professional hockey team from 1911 to 1922
Bangor Millionaires, minor league baseball club from 1894 to 1897
Melville Millionaires, junior hockey team

Other 
Millionaire (video game)
Tony Millionaire (born 1956), American cartoonist, illustrator, and author

See also
 The Millionaire (disambiguation), including The Millionairess
 Super Millionaire (disambiguation)
 Who Wants to Be a Millionaire? (disambiguation), a game show franchise